Ciputra World Surabaya (Mall) is a mall in Surabaya, Indonesia. Officially opened on 22 July 2011, it is located in a super-block at the gate of West Surabaya in Mayjend Sungkono. Ciputa World Surbaya was built on a  site in a Central Business District area and developed by Dr. HC. Ir. Ciputra. It is currently the 14th largest building in the world based on floor area.

Cipurtra World Surabaya was architecturally designed by an architecture firm based in Singapore, DP Architects, which it has also designed The Dubai Mall, Suntec City and Esplanade – Theatres on the Bay – Singapore.

Built in a super-block area, this mall is surrounded by a hotel, residential and office towers, such as Ciputra World Surabaya Hotel, The Via and The Vue Apartments, Skyloft – The Voila Apartment. In the third phase of its development, the mall now contains a Multifunction Hall, Office Tower, Vieloft, The Vertu Apartment and Sky Residence.

The Extension Mall was opened on 30 March 2021 and houses clothing-retail brand stores including IKEA, restaurants and facilities such as an Outdoor Park, Outdoor Car Parking and a Skylight Garden in the dining area on the 3rd floor, as well as a dining area that contains alfresco seatings.

See also

List of largest buildings
List of tallest buildings in Surabaya
List of tallest buildings in Indonesia
Ciputra World Jakarta
Tunjungan Plaza
Pakuwon Mall

References

Post-independence architecture of Indonesia
Shopping malls in Surabaya
Skyscraper office buildings in Indonesia
Skyscrapers in Surabaya